Indian wedding cards are cards that are made and distributed to invite guests to the wedding ceremony and to honour and commemorate the wedding of two people. Since the medieval period, Indian wedding cards have carried great importance in the Indian subcontinent, and are known through several names such as :निमंत्रण पत्र/पत्रिका, (Nimantran Patra/Lagnapatrika/Kankotri and more).  These invitation cards are used for announcing the marriage ceremony and this process of sending an invitation card to guests and relatives forms an integral part of the ritual. Simultaneously, these cards are famous throughout India for their unique patterns, colors and symbols. The presence of these different elements in a marriage card makes it appropriate for the matrimonial ceremony, and without it the event would be considered incomplete or unsuccessful.

These wedding cards are designed with various gemstones, Kundan's, ribbon's and precious jewels to give, what some would call graceful grace to their particular matrimonial ceremony. While purchasing or selecting marriage invitation cards, it is necessary to keep in mind certain basic points like wedding theme, quality of the paper used, budget and more.

Features of Indian wedding cards 

To select wedding cards the bride and groom go along with their family members to make the selection of invitation cards which suits their style and wedding theme. The couple select the card on the basis of various elements which are as follows:-

• Designs or Patterns- Usually for Indian wedding cards have designs like peacock or peacock feather; diya (lamp), swastika, and OM are used for designing these cards. These designs have religious meaning and speak about the Indian culture.

• Colors- Various types of colors such as red, orange, yellow, green and many more are used in preparing these cards. At the same time, special importance is given to color combination because it must match with the patterns used in the invitations.

• Wordings- Indian wedding cards are written in English as well as the Hindi language. The wordings used in them are very simple and easy to understand. The cards contain the details of the venue with date and time, name of the bride and groom along with their parents. The main motto is to invite the guests to give their blessings to the newlywed couple or bride & groom.

• Embellishment – Indian wedding cards decorated with beautiful ornaments and jewels to give a distinguished look to the cards

Indian weddings are usually a large gathering wherein each and every family members along with their friends attend and enjoy the whole celebration. In this culture, wedding is regarded as one of the most auspicious occasion and which is not just the weaving of two persons rather it is a ceremony of unification of two families with the same culture and traditions. The whole function marks a new beginning in the life of the bride and groom along with their family members. The wedding ceremony is performed for at least 2 to 3 days and during this time different types of ceremonies are performed and main significance is given to spiritual matters.

In Indian culture, not much importance is given to save the date cards, RSVP cards or thank you cards.  Guest can turn up at the function along with their family members or friends. At the same time, there is no restriction on the number of guests allowed to attend the function. There are no registrations or checkpoint because most of the people attending a wedding might not have even received a formal invitation to attend the function. Usually, the number of people or guests attending an Indian wedding is more than 500, and it is a regular affair to attend marriages in India. At the same time, most people are invited through word of mouth and the success of the whole affair depends on the number of people attending it.

While comparing with other types of wedding, reception cards (especially in South Indian marriages) are given to the guests because in this culture there is no tradition of a baraat (a groom's procession).

This is so as to delineate the ritual laden wedding ceremony proper to be attended by only the closest people; family and friends whereas the more opulent reception is attended by all.

Below is an example for some of the most common symbols used:
 Wedding ceremony symbols- Several types of symbols like Swastika, OM, Lord Ganesha and many more are printed on the cards to make it perfect for the marriage ceremony.
 Ganesh wedding symbols- Lord Ganesha is considered as God of education and wealth. In Indian culture, Lord Ganesha is worshiped first to remove all the obstructions and hurdles and before starting an auspicious event like matrimonial ceremony. Due to this characteristic, the symbol of Lord Ganesha is printed on the Indian wedding cards, with a belief that Lord Ganesha will make the wedding successful and hurdle free.
 Kalasha symbols- The symbol of Kalasha is prominent Vedic symbol which is a vase covered with leaves and symbolizes bliss, abundance and joy.
 Swastika symbols- This Swastika symbol means all is well and is an ancient symbol present in numerous and diverse cultures around the world which symbolizes peace and happiness.
 Doli symbols- This symbol denotes glee, fun, happiness and marks the beginning of an auspicious occasion. It not only brings happiness to the faces of guests who are attending the wedding but also used to seek blessings from the God before starting an event.
 Om symbols- The OM symbol has a deep cultural and religious significance in the Indian society. It is the universally accepted and the supreme symbol of Hinduism all across the globe. This sacred symbol represents ultimate peace and harmony. It is printed on Indian wedding cards to bring harmony and peace to a function like marriage.
 Christian symbols- The symbols printed on the Christian wedding cards are the cross, church, the Lord Jesus and many more. These symbols denote purity, simplicity and holiness. The symbols are believed to bring sanctity to the whole wedding function.
 Muslim symbols- In the Muslim community, marriage is regarded as an auspicious occasion and various types of symbols like the Star and Crescent, Bismillah, Allah and many more printed on the wedding invitation card to seek the blessings from the God.
 Moon symbols- It is regarded as the symbol of Islam and includes an image of a crescent moon and a star. It represents faith in God. It is printed on invitation cards as a holy symbol and marks the beginning of an auspicious occasion.
 786 (Basmala)- This number is considered very lucky in Islam and is believed that 786 is the number of days in which Allah created the world. It is also used to mark the starting of an auspicious or good event.

References

Indian wedding
Marriage in Pakistan
Bangladeshi wedding